Yugoslav Navy (JRM) training ship Galeb, also known as The Peace Ship Galeb (Brod Mira Galeb), was used as an official yacht by the late President of the Yugoslav Republic, Marshal Josip Broz Tito. The ship attained an iconic status among the peoples of Yugoslavia in this role, as well as among the many diverse nations and members of the Non-Aligned Movement. "Galeb" is Serbo-Croatian for "seagull".

History

Galeb was built in 1938 in Genoa as the auxiliary cruiser Ramb III, destined for service in the banana trade between Africa and Italy. After the armistice in 1943, it was taken over by the Germans and turned it into a minelayer under the name Kiebitz. While in Rijeka it was sunk on 25 November 1944 by Allied aircraft. Brodospas (SHIPSAVING) from Split, raised Kiebitz in 1948, after which it was taken to the Pula ship building company Uljanik where in 1952 it was reconstructed as a school ship of the Yugoslav Navy under the new name Galeb. Tito embarked on it the first time in 1952 in Podgora, where he conducted an inspection of the boats in the YWN from the deck of the ship. In the next 27 years Galeb was in Tito’s service for a total of 549 days, of which, for 318 days, the Marshal was on board, sailing  over the Adriatic and other seas on political missions. By Tito’s death, 102 world statesmen had stayed on Galeb.

Galeb is 117 metres long and 15 metres wide with a displacement of 5,754 tonnes. With the speed of  it is powered by two Fiat diesel engines of 7,200 horsepower in total. The Italians, at one point, offered to SFRJ to remove them and exhibit them in the Fiat museum in Torino. In return, they offered to build an entirely new, modern, school ship, but the Yugoslavs declined.

The ship first came to international attention in March 1953 when it brought Tito from Yugoslavia to the River Thames, following the invitation from the British Government headed by Prime Minister Winston Churchill. It was the first visit to United Kingdom of a communist head of state. Due to the yacht's size, Galeb moored at Greenwich. Proposals for the ship to dock at Malta en route to Britain were refused by the islands' Governor.

Tito loved the glamour the yacht conferred on his regime. He used it for parties, foreign visits and diplomacy. World leaders entertained there included Nikita Khrushchev, Muammar Gaddafi and Indira Gandhi. Tito was particularly excited to welcome Elizabeth Taylor and Richard Burton, who played Tito in the 1973 war epic The Battle of Sutjeska.

Galeb was used by Marshal Tito from 1948 till his death in 1980. Following the breakup of Yugoslavia in 1991, the yacht became the property of the Montenegrin government. It was sold to John Paul Papanicolaou, the same Greek yachtsman who owned the yacht Christina O. It was moored on the quayside of the Viktor Lenac Shipyard in Kostrena, a suburb of Rijeka for a time before being towed to its current location on the Rijeka waterfront. The Croatian authorities placed a preservation order on Galeb in the hope of acquiring the vessel to become a museum ship. In September 2008 the boat partially sank on its right side after a leak developed in its hull. On 22 May 2009, the ship was sold to city of Rijeka for US$150,000, subsequently confirmed by the High Mercantile Court of Croatia.

Since then it has occasionally been opened to the public for art exhibitions, conferences and the like. On 16 July 2014, the Mayor of Rijeka announced that the Galeb would be leased out for mixed use, partly as a museum incorporating the former President's private rooms and some of the engineering space, and partly for commercial activities such as restaurants and bars.  Tenders for private sector investment were invited, but produced no response. Funding of EUR 4.5 million was secured as part of Rijeka's successful bid to become European Capital of Culture in 2020.  The work is expected to be done by mid-2021.

Some of Galeb's furniture has already been restored and is temporarily being shown in Rijeka City Museum awaiting completion of the ships restoration.

Guests

Heads of state
The following heads of state have been entertained on the Galeb:

 Prime Minister Jawaharlal Nehru - India
 President Gamal Abdel Nasser - Egypt
 Queen Elizabeth II - UK
 Secretary General Nikita Sergeyevich Khrushchev - USSR
 Secretary General Leonid Brezhnev - USSR
 Emperor Haille Selassie - Ethiopia
 UN Secretary General and President Kurt Waldheim - Austria
 President Nicolae Ceauşescu - Romania
 Chairman Muammar Gaddafi - Libya
 Prime Minister Indira Gandhi - India

Private citizens
The following people have been entertained on the Galeb:
 Kirk Douglas
 Richard Burton
 Sophia Loren
 Elizabeth Taylor

See also

List of motor yachts by length

Ships of comparable role, configuration and era
 HMY Britannia
 USS Williamsburg

References

Bibliography

External links 

 
 Le fantôme de Tito
 Titov "Galeb" postaje muzej
 Školski brod "Galeb"
 GREAT BRITAIN: The Tito Visit
 Rijeka kupila Titov brod

1938 ships
World War II naval ships of Italy
RAMB ships
Naval ships of Italy captured by Germany during World War II
Ships of the Yugoslav Navy
Royal and presidential yachts
Museum ships in Croatia
Ships built by Gio. Ansaldo & C.
Ships built in Genoa